Da Vinci's City Hall is a Canadian dramatic television series, which premiered on CBC Television on 25 October 2005 and ended on 28 February 2006. It is a spin-off of the long-running Canadian series Da Vinci's Inquest. The creator, writer and executive producer of the series was Chris Haddock.

Overview
Nicholas Campbell reprises his role as Dominic Da Vinci, a former coroner entering municipal politics as the mayor of Vancouver, British Columbia. Da Vinci is based on the real-life experiences of Larry Campbell, the former chief coroner of Vancouver who was elected that city's mayor in 2002.

With the series regular Ian Tracey (playing Mick Leary) inheriting the coroner's job, the show toggles back and forth between crime scenes and politics. Haddock says: "My approach was to make all the political stuff criminal and all the criminal stuff political. When we're in city hall we're really about conspiracy and scheming, who's crooked and who's going to get caught."

Cast 

Nicholas Campbell as Dominick da Vinci
Mylene Dinh-Robic as Rita Mah
Benjamin Ratner as Sam Berger
Ian Tracey as Coroner Mick Leary
Venus Terzo as Detective Angela Kosmo
Brian Markinson as Police Chief Bill Jacobs
Fred Keating as Councillor Jack Pierce
 Simone Bailly as Constable Jan Ferris
 Stephen E. Miller
Evan Adams
Colin Cunningham as Detective Brian Curtis
Patrick Gallagher as Joe Finn
Dean Marshall as Detective Carter
Terence Kelly as Fire Chief Ed Welles
 Rebecca Robins
Hrothgar Mathews as Sgt. Charlie Klotchko
Charles Martin Smith as Joe Friedland
Eugene Lipinski as Lloyd Manning
Gina Holden as Claire
Alex Diakun as Detective Chick Savoy
Hiro Kanagawa as Fire Captain Roy Komori

Episodes

Cancellation
With an average weekly audience of just 400,000 viewers, Da Vinci's City Hall lost about half of the former audience for Da Vinci's Inquest. On February 13, 2006, the CBC announced that the show would not be brought back for a second season in 2006, although they also indicated that negotiations were underway to reprise the Da Vinci character in a series of television movies, similar to the manner in which North of 60 continued after its run as a weekly series had ended. The first of those TV movies, The Quality of Life, aired on CBC on June 14, 2008.

The show's final episode was aired on February 28, 2006.  The program was repeated on the Canadian channel Showcase during the summer of 2008.

CBC management has been criticized for cancelling the show to make room for other series that have since proved less successful.

Broadcast in the United States
Beginning April 27, 2007, Superstation WGN began airing Da Vinci's City Hall, but it is promoted by American syndicator Program Partners as "Season 8" of Da Vinci's Inquest, even using the same intro as that series (which was used only late into the show's original run) despite the fact that some of the characters seen are not present in the new series.

Nationwide syndication to local stations began in November 2007, also as part of the Da Vinci's Inquest package, with that show's titles.

References

External links

Official website, accessed 23 August 2007
CBC's webpage for Da Vinci's City Hall, accessed 4 February 2007
WGN page for Da Vinci's Inquest (Da Vinci's City Hall is incorporated as Season 8)

2005 Canadian television series debuts
2006 Canadian television series endings
2000s Canadian drama television series
CBC Television original programming
Television series by Entertainment One
Television series by Sony Pictures Television
Canadian television spin-offs
Television shows set in Vancouver
Television shows filmed in Vancouver
Canadian political drama television series